Cetacean morbillivirus (CeMV) is a virus that infects marine mammals in the order Cetacea, which includes dolphins, porpoises and whales. Three genetically distinct strains have been identified: dolphin morbillivirus (DMV), pilot whale morbillivirus (PWMV) and porpoise morbillivirus (PMV). Symptoms of infection are often a severe combination of pneumonia, encephalitis and damage to the immune system, which greatly impair the cetacean's ability to swim and stay afloat unassisted. Since its discovery in 1987, CeMV has been responsible for numerous epizootics of mass mortality in cetacean populations. Epizootics of CeMV can be easily identified by a significant increase in the number of stranded cetaceans on beaches and shores.

References

Morbilliviruses